The 2012–13 Delfino Pescara 1936 season was the 77th season in club history. It was Pescara's first season back in the Serie A since the 1992–93 season and the sixth overall in the top-flight in the club's history.

Players

Current squad

Out on loan

Matches

Legend

Serie A

Coppa Italia

Squad statistics

Appearances and goals

|-
! colspan="10" style="background:#dcdcdc; text-align:center"| Goalkeepers

|-
! colspan="10" style="background:#dcdcdc; text-align:center"| Defenders

|-
! colspan="10" style="background:#dcdcdc; text-align:center"| Midfielders

|-
! colspan="10" style="background:#dcdcdc; text-align:center"| Forwards

|-
! colspan="10" style="background:#dcdcdc; text-align:center"| Players transferred out during the season

Top scorers
This includes all competitive matches.  The list is sorted by shirt number when total goals are equal.
{| class="wikitable sortable" style="font-size: 95%; text-align: center;"
|-
!width=15|
!width=15|
!width=15|
!width=15|
!width=150|Name
!width=80|Serie A
!width=80|Coppa Italia
!width=80|Total
|-
|1
|17
|MF
|
|Vladimír Weiss
|4
|1
|5
|-
|2
|10
|FW
|
|Mervan Çelik
|4
|0
|4
|-
|3
|4
|MF
|
|Emmanuel Cascione
|2
|1
|3
|-
|4
|8
|MF
|
|Birkir Bjarnason
|2
|0
|2
|-
|=
|9
|FW
|
|Elvis Abbruscato
|2
|0
|2
|-
|=
|21
|MF
|
|Eugênio Rômulo Togni
|2
|0
|2
|-
|=
|70
|MF
|
|Gaetano D'Agostino
|2
|0
|2
|-
|=
|88
|DF
|
|Christian Terlizzi
|2
|0
|2
|-
|=
|99
|FW
|
|Gianluca Caprari
|2
|0
|2
|-
|10
|7
|MF
|
|Giuseppe Sculli
|1
|0
|1
|-
|=
|22
|FW
|
|Ante Vukušić
|1
|0
|1
|-
|=
|46
|DF
|
|Marco Vittiglio
|1
|0
|1
|-
|=
|80
|FW
|
|Jonathas
|1
|0
|1
|-
|=
|93
|MF
|
|Juan Quintero
|1
|0
|1

Sources

Pescara
Delfino Pescara 1936 seasons